Anna Niki Stamolamprou (born August 26, 1995) is a Greek basketball point guard who plays for Olympiacos and the Greek national team.

She participated at the EuroBasket Women 2017.

References

1995 births
Living people
Greek women's basketball players
Basketball players from Thessaloniki
PAOK Women's Basketball players
Olympiacos Women's Basketball players
Point guards
Greek expatriate basketball people in the United States